M-1 Global (Mixfight-1) or MMA-1 (Mixed martial arts-1) is a mixed martial arts promotion based in St. Petersburg, Russia which organizes between 10 and 20 competitions per year.

It hosted its first major show (rather than co-promoting with other organizations) entitled M-1 Global Presents Breakthrough on August 28, 2009 at Memorial Hall in Kansas City, Kansas.

M-1, in 2009, signed a contract to co-promote with Explosion Entertainment.

UFC partnership 
On July 18, 2018, it was announced that M-1 has agreed in a partnership with Ultimate Fighting Championship (UFC) where M-1 Global serves as the farm league for the UFC to scout Russian fighters for the UFC and  involves in preparation and organizes new shows in Russia. Part of the deal also allows M-1 champions to have the opportunity to sign with the UFC.

M-1 Challenge

M-1 Challenge is a competition organized with a series of events held in many places around the world. The events are broadcast in over 100 countries, mainly Russia, Europe and the FSU countries.

M-1 Selection

The M-1 Selection is a MMA competition where the next generation of fighters are given the opportunity to showcase their skills on the world stage with fighters being eliminated after only one loss; victory will advance the winning fighters throughout the tournament and earn them a trip to the championship event where they will compete for a “M-1 Selection” title.

List of Recent and Upcoming M-1 Global events

Current M-1 Global champions

Current M-1 USA National champions

List of M-1 Global champions

M-1 Global Heavyweight Championship 
Weight limit:

M-1 Global Light Heavyweight Championship 
Weight limit:

M-1 Global Middleweight Championship 
Weight limit:

M-1 Global Welterweight Championship 
Weight limit:

M-1 Global Lightweight Championship 
Weight limit:

M-1 Global Featherweight Championship 
Weight limit:

M-1 Global Bantamweight Championship 
Weight limit:

M-1 Global Flyweight Championship 
Weight limit:

M-1 USA National Welterweight Championship 
Weight limit:

Notable fighters
  Fedor Emelianenko
  Alistair Overeem
  Khabib Nurmagomedov
  Jeff Monson
  Alexander Volkov
  Alexey Oliynyk
  Sergei Kharitonov
  Pedro Rizzo
  Alexander Shlemenko
  Vadim Nemkov
  Vinny Magalhães
  Alexander Emelianenko
  Paul Bradley
  Phil De Fries
  Carlos Eduardo
  Ramazan Emeev
  Yasubey Enomoto
  Maiquel Falcão
  Luigi Fioravanti
  Konstantin Gluhov
  Damian Grabowski
  Brandon Halsey
  Satoshi Ishii
  Chris Kelades
  Rustam Khabilov
  Alexey Kudin
  Mickaël Lebout
  Caio Magalhães
  Rashid Magomedov 
  Ronny Markes
  Cody McKenzie
  Mario Miranda
  Tomasz Narkun
  Viktor Nemkov
  Joe Riggs
  Shahbulat Shamhalaev
  Kirill Sidelnikov   
  Sokoudjou
  Mairbek Taisumov
  Vyacheslav Vasilevsky
  Attila Vegh
  Daniel Weichel
  Alexander Yakovlev
  Shamil Zavurov
  Mikhail Zayats
  Hayder Hassan
  Enoc Solves

See also
List of current mixed martial arts champions
M-1 Challenge

References

External links
  (English)

Organizations established in 1997
Mixed martial arts organizations
Mixed martial arts in Russia
 
1997 establishments in Russia
Sports organizations of Russia